Paulo Alexandre, born in Vouzela, Portugal on February 16, 1931, is a Portuguese singer.

He started his artistic career in 1954 on National Radio. Together with António Sala they start Rossil records, Verde Vinho gained two gold discs in 1978 and 1979, before also being a big hit in Brazil also going gold.
	
In 2010, Paulo published the book "Duas Vidas numa Só", subtitle "Entre Cifrões e Canções", which includes accounts of his artistic career and also his successful career as a banker. The compact Records releases a CD with some of the most successful songs of the artist.

Discography

Albums

Eu e o Outro (LP, Transmédia) VLP 50.002
Canções Da Minha (CD)
Melhor dos Melhores nº 90 (CD)
Tributo (CD, Polygram, 1991)
Canções da Minha Saudade, vol.1 (CD, Movieplay, 1993)
Verde Vinho - Colecção Caravela (CD, EMi)
O melhor dos melhores #90 (CD, Movieplay, 1999)
Verde Vinho (CD, Compact, 2010)

Singles and EP's

Agora Ou Nunca/Ana Cristina/Escravo/Nocturno (EP, Alvorada) AEP 60533
Dancemos O Twist/Horizonte de Esperança/T-4/Galope (EP, Alvorada) AEP 60615
Estranhos Na Noite (EP, Alvorada)
História de Amor/Um Dia, Amor (Orfeu)
Concerto Para Ti/África (O Primeiro Do Emigrante) (Single, Orfeu, 1976) KSAT 554
Verde Vinho/Vem Valsar Com o Papá (Single, Rossil, 1977) Ross 7001 
Oferece As Tuas Mãos/Foi Tudo (Single, Rossil, 1978) Ross 7007 
Voltei Para Ficar/Rosas Vermelhas Para O Meu Amor (Single, Rossil) Ross 7010	 
Meninos da Cidade/ Gaiato de Lisboa (Single, Rossil) Ross 7021 	
Aquela Cativa/Alma Perdida (Single, Rossil) Ross 7066  	
Vem Comigo a Portugal / Ven conmigo A Portugal (Single, Rossil, 1979)	  	  	
Vede Minho (Single, CBS, 1983) 
Verde Vinho (New recording/Verde Vinho (orchestral version) (Single, CBS) CBS A4446  
Guitarra Minha Amiga/Versão Instrumental (Single, Polygram, 1987)

External links
http://www.macua.org/biografias/pauloalexandre.html
http://www.imdb.com/name/nm1911774/
http://www.citwf.com/film371023.htm

20th-century Portuguese male singers
1931 births
Living people
People from Vouzela